Tourism in Morocco is well developed, maintaining a strong tourist industry focused on the country's coast, culture, and history. The Moroccan government created a Ministry of Tourism in 1985. Tourism is considered one of the main foreign exchange sources in Morocco and since 2013 it had the highest number of arrivals out of the countries in Africa. In 2018, 12.3 million tourists were reported to have visited Morocco.

History of tourism

In the second half of the 1980s and the early 1990s, between 1 and 1.5 million Europeans visited Morocco. Most of these visitors were French or Spanish, with about 100,000 each from Britain, Italy, Germany, and the Netherlands. Tourists mostly visited large beach resorts along the Atlantic coast, particularly Agadir. About 20,000 people from Saudi Arabia visited, some of whom bought holiday homes. Receipts from tourism fell by 16.5% in 1990, the year the Gulf War began. In 1994, Algeria closed its border with Morocco after the Marrakech attack, which caused the number of Algerian visitors to fall considerably; there were 70,000 visitors in 1994 and 13,000 in 1995, compared to 1.66 million in 1992 and 1.28 million in 1993. In 2017, there were 10.3 million tourist arrivals, compared with about 10.1 million in 2016, a 1.5% year-over-year increase. 30% of the tourists were one of the 3.8 million Moroccans living abroad. Marrakech itself had over 2 million visitors in 2017. In 2019, more than 13 million tourists visited Morocco. In 2020, Morocco witnessed an all time low with no more than 4 million tourists, due to the spread of the COVID-19. In 2023, Marrakech was voted Top 10 Best Destinations for International Tourists by Tripadvisor.

Tourism industry
Tourist receipts in 2007 totaled US$7.55 billion. 
Tourism is the second largest foreign exchange earner in Morocco, after the phosphate industry. The Moroccan government is heavily investing in tourism development. A new tourism strategy called Vision 2010 was developed after the accession of King Mohammed VI in 1999. The government targeted that Morocco will have 10 million visitors by 2010, with the hope that tourism will then have risen to 20% of GDP. A large government sponsored marketing campaigns to attract tourists advertised Morocco as a cheap and exotic, yet safe, place for European tourists.

Morocco's relatively high number of tourists has been aided by its location, tourist attractions, and relatively low price. Cruise ships visit the ports of Casablanca and Tangier. Morocco is close to Europe and attracts visitors to its beaches. Because of its proximity to Spain, tourists in southern Spain's coastal areas take one- to three-day trips to Morocco. Marrakesh and Agadir are the top two destinations in the country. Air services between Morocco and Algeria have been established, many Algerians have gone to Morocco to shop and visit family and friends. Morocco is relatively inexpensive because of the interesting dirham exchange rate compared to major currencies and the increase of hotel prices in neighborhood Spain. Morocco has an excellent road and rail infrastructure that links the major cities and tourist destinations with ports and cities with international airports. Low-cost airlines offer cheap flights to the country.

Plan Azur
The "Plan Azur", is a large-scale project initiated by King Mohammed VI, is meant to provide for creating six coastal resorts for holiday-home owners and tourists (five on the Atlantic coast and one on the Mediterranean), the Daily Telegraph noted. The plan also includes other large-scale development projects such as upgrading regional airports to attract budget airlines, and building new train and road links. Through these efforts the country achieved an 11% percent rise in tourism in the first five months of 2008 compared with the same period the previous year, it said, adding that French visitors topped the list with 927,000 followed by Spaniards (587,000) and Britons (141,000). Morocco, which is close to Europe, has a mix of culture and the exotic that makes it popular with Europeans buying holiday homes.[15]

Tourist attractions

The country's attractions can be divided into seven regions: 
 The four Imperial cities — the four historical capital cities of Morocco: Fez, Marrakesh, Meknes and Rabat
 Casablanca — Morocco's largest city; home of the Hassan II Mosque, which has the world's second tallest minaret at 656 feet
 Tangier and the surrounding area
 Ouarzazate — a noted film-making location; the fortified village (ksar) of Ait Benhaddou west of the city is a UNESCO World Heritage Site
 Agadir and its beach resorts
 Tarfaya and its beach resorts
Fez – Morocco's second largest city and it is the science and spiritual capital of Morocco. It contains an old area which is considered the biggest area in the world where vehicles can't get in. It is also the home of "Al Qarawyien" the world's oldest university.
 Merzouga  – Merzouga is a small village in southeastern Morocco, about 35 km (22 mi) southeast of Rissani and about 55 km (34 mi) southeast of Erfoud.

While Morocco was a French Protectorate (from 1912 to 1956) tourism was focused on urban areas such as the Mediterranean cities of Tangier and Casablanca. Tangier attracted many writers, such as Edith Wharton, Jack Kerouac, Paul Bowles, and William S. Burroughs. There was a period of beach resort development at places such as Agadir on the Atlantic coast in the 1970s and 1980s.

Tourism is increasingly focused on Morocco's culture, such as its ancient cities. The modern tourist industry capitalizes on Morocco's ancient Roman and Islamic sites, and on its landscape and cultural history. 60% of Morocco's tourists visit for its culture and heritage.

Agadir is a major coastal resort and has a third of all Moroccan bed nights. It is a base for tours to the Atlas Mountains. Other resorts in north Morocco are also very popular. Casablanca is the major cruise port in Morocco, and has the best developed market for tourists in Morocco.

As of 2006, activity and adventure tourism in the Atlas and Rif Mountains are the fastest growth area in Moroccan tourism. These locations have excellent walking and trekking opportunities from late March to mid-November. The government is investing in trekking circuits. They are also developing desert tourism in competition with Tunisia.

UNESCO World Heritage Sites
Morocco is home to nine UNESCO World Heritage Sites.

'''

Fez 

Fez was the capital city of modern Morocco until 1925 and is now the capital of the Fès-Meknès administrative region. The city has two old medina quarters, the larger of which is Fes el Bali. It is listed as a World Heritage Site and is believed to be one of the world's largest urban pedestrian zones (car-free areas). University of Al Quaraouiyine, founded in 859, is the oldest continuously functioning university in the world. The city has been called the "Mecca of the West" and the "Athens of Africa", a nickname it shares with Cyrene in Libya.

Fez is a popular tourist destination and many non-Moroccans are now restoring traditional houses (riads and dars) as second homes in the Fez medina. The most important monuments in the city are:
 Bou Inania Madrasa
 Al-Attarine Madrasa
 University of Al Quaraouiyine
 Zaouia Moulay Idriss II
 Dar al-Magana
 Ibn Danan Synagogue

Marrakesh

Marrakech in central Morocco is a popular tourist destination, but is more popular among tourists for one- and two-day excursions that provide a taste of Morocco's history and culture. The Majorelle botanical garden in Marrakech is a popular tourist attraction. It was bought by the fashion designer Yves Saint-Laurent and Pierre Bergé in 1980. Their presence in the city helped to boost the city's profile as a tourist destination.

Tangier 
Tangier, formerly the International Zone from 1923 to 1956, is a city in north of Morocco. Formerly part of the Spanish Protectorate in Morocco, Tangier is a blend of Spanish, Moroccan, and Berber cultures. Famous tourist sites in the city and near it include the Tangier-American Legation, Hercules Cave, the Kasbah museum, the Perdicaris Parc, the Musée de Carmen-Macein, Museum of Moroccan Arts and Antiquities, Museum of Contemporary Art, the Grand Socco, the Petit Socco, and Gran Teatro Cervantes.

El Jadida

El Jadida, formerly called Mazagan by the Portuguese, was registered as a UNESCO World Heritage Site in 2004, on the basis of its status as an "outstanding example of the interchange of influences between European and Moroccan cultures" and as an "early example of the realisation of the Renaissance ideals integrated with Portuguese construction technology". According to UNESCO, the most important buildings from the Portuguese period are the cistern, and the Manueline Church of the Assumption. El Jadida is also home to the annual Salon du Cheval–the largest horse expo in Africa.

Safety 
Caution is advised due to terrorism. Recent examples are April 2011 terrorist attacks in Marrakesh, the Murders of Louisa Vesterager Jespersen and Maren Ueland in Imlil December 2018, and the western Saharan war occurring in its southern provinces.

See also
Economy of Morocco
Investment in Morocco
Museums in Morocco
Plan Azur
Surfing in Morocco
Tourism in Africa
Tourism in Algeria
Visa policy of Morocco

References

External links

 
Morocco